Gabella is a village in Tuscany, central Italy, administratively a frazione of the comune of Calci, province of Pisa.

Gabella is about 9 km from Pisa and 2 km from Calci.

References

Bibliography 
 

Frazioni of the Province of Pisa